The township  /  is bordered on the east by the sea of Quarnero from S.Martino to Brovinje; to the North by the Township Chermenizza; and to the East by the Township . In the hamlet of Skitača is the chapel of Saint Lucy of Albona which became a parish church for all of the Township of Cerovica. The small chapel was built in 1616 and became a Parish in 1632. The last time it was renovated was in the 1990s.

Cerovica as it was during the Venice Republic and the Austria-Hungary occupation. It was one of the 12 subdivisions as Commune or Parish in the District of Albona.

History
From antique times,  / , and   /  were two Castles and were considered one District. In 1632 the Administrator of Dalmatia and Albania, Antonio Civran, divided the territory of Albona,  /  into 12 fractions. The names of these fractions were, Albona/Labin, Rippenda, S.Domenica/S.Nedeglia, Dubrova, Chermenizza, Vlahovo/Vlakovo, Cerovizza/Cerovica, Vettua, Cere, Cugn, Bergod, Fianona,
During the Austrian redivision in 1814-1818 there made two Agricultural municipalities. One was Fianona/Plomin, which consisted of Cerre, Cugn, S.Domenica/S.Nedeglia, Dubrova, Ripenda, Vettua. The other was Albona/Labin, with the fractions of Chermenizza, Bergod, Vlahovo, Cerovizza.

Cerovica in the 1800
Cerovica was one of twelve Municipalities or Townships in the Labinština peninsula in Istria County, Croatia, during the Austria-Hungary Empire. Cerovica is also the name of a small hamlet north of Skitača in the former municipality of Cerovica (Istria). Also called "St.Lucia di Albona", Skitača. The Municipality of Cerovica (Istria) is located in the southern part of the District of Albona, (Istrian Circle) in the most southern township of the Labinstina peninsula. It is made up of eight various hills some of which are cultivable land. Most of the land was stony and very tough for the settlers when they clear it.
Cerovica (Istria) borders the Adriatic Sea at the east and south coast. On the north is the municipality of Chermanizza (Istria). On the southwest is the municipality of Vlahovo (Istria).
There were no roads until 1930–40 in the municipality of Cerovica (Istria). Only small paths (called ) which people and animals used to go to various places. The Cement factory in Koromačno built the road in 1930-40 which is used today to go to Labin and other cities. 
In 1820 there were 405 people living in the municipality of Cerovica (Istria). The people owned 107 oxen, 69 cows, 1,098 sheep. In 1800 there were 86 houses most of which were made of dry stone walls and straw roofs. Many hamlets grew tremendously during the Austrian occupation. Some owners owned more than one house and some as many as four.

Hamlets in Cerovica in the 1800
During the Austria-Hungary occupation and re-organization the settlements which belonged to Cerovica with Skitača as the "sotto comune".

1827 census data

Land classifications

Chapels in Cerovica 
 These are some of the chapels in the Cerovica in Istria County Croatia.

Village is a group of houses in the country, larger than hamlet and smaller than a town or city. Such a community incorporated as a municipality There were no villages in the Township of Cerovica in the 1800, only hamlets and small settlements with a few houses.  In the hamlet of Prodol there was a coal mine which employed between four and six men daily. The people of the hamlet of Brovinje near the sea were fishermen and farmers. The names of these hamlets were German in the 1800s. Between 1918 and 1945 the names were changed to Italian. After 1945, the names were changed again, this time to Croatian. Some hamlets joined with other very close hamlets or fractions to form a brand new name or using only one name for the group.

See also

Brovinje
Koromačno
Skitača
Labinština
Austria-Hungary
District of Albona

References

History of Istria
Istria County
Austrian Littoral
Populated places in Istria County